James J. Smith is a retired FBI Supervisory Special agent. He served the FBI from October 1970 to November 2000 and specialized in Chinese counterintelligence. He was based in the FBI's Los Angeles field office.

Career 
Smith was an FBI agent who supervised the LA Field Office's Foreign Counterintelligence (FCI) China squad from 1998 until his retirement in November 2000.
Smith helped the FBI's investigation into the possibility that China tried to contribute money to the 1996 US elections in order to gain influence.

2003 arrest
Smith was arrested on Wednesday, April 9, 2003 and charged with gross negligence for allowing an FBI asset, Katrina Leung access to classified material. He allegedly had an affair with Leung for 20 years, and allegedly brought classified materials to their trysts. In 2003, he and Leung pleaded not guilty.

2004 plea agreement
Smith pleaded guilty to a charge of falsely concealing his alleged affair with Katrina Leung, from the FBI. He was sentenced to three months' home confinement for lying to the FBI about his affair. He also was ordered to perform 100 hours of community service. The plea allowed Smith to avoid prison time. Prosecutors also agreed to drop three other charges, including two counts of gross negligence in his handling of national security documents.

See also
Katrina Leung

References

External links
Affidavit

American spies
Living people
Year of birth missing (living people)
Federal Bureau of Investigation agents convicted of crimes
People convicted of making false statements